White Shadows in the South Seas is a 1928 American silent film adventure romance directed by W.S. Van Dyke and starring Monte Blue and Raquel Torres. It was produced by Cosmopolitan Productions in association with MGM and distributed by MGM. Loosely based on the travel book of the same name by Frederick O'Brien, it is known for being the first MGM film to be released with a pre-recorded soundtrack. Clyde De Vinna won an Academy Award for Best Cinematography.

Plot 
Dr. Matthew Lloyd, an alcoholic doctor, is disgusted by white traders' exploitation of native pearl divers on a Polynesian island. They give the divers well below the value of the pearls while the divers suffer numerous injuries, some fatal, from the sea bed and from diving without breathing equipment.

When a diver is gravely injured, Sebastian, a leading trader, is indifferent, demanding the other divers keep working. When Lloyd remonstrates, Sebastian threatens him, demands he leave the island and swings a punch at him. Later, the diver dies despite Lloyd's treatment but the traders have a party all the same.

Sebastian tricks Lloyd onto an arriving ship by saying they have measles. His men tie the doctor up and send the ship off unmanned. Lloyd survives a storm and is washed ashore on an island where none of the natives has ever seen a white man.

Cast
Monte Blue as Dr. Lloyd
Raquel Torres as Fayaway
Robert Anderson as Sebastian
Renee Bush as Fayaway's friend (uncredited)

Production history
The film is inspired by the 1919 travel book of the same name by Frederick O'Brien, who spent a year in the South Pacific with Marquesas Islanders.  The film began production in 1927 as a co-venture between documentary filmmaker Robert Flaherty, Cosmopolitan and MGM. The production was filmed in Tahiti, 4000 miles from Hollywood, a rarity for the time.

The film is known for being the first MGM film to be released with a pre-recorded soundtrack. The soundtrack consisted of a romantic score by William Axt and David Mendoza, with a few sound effects such as wind howling, a storm, trees ruffling and the words "Hello" and "wait."  The Tahitian location was sumptuously captured by cameramen Clyde De Vinna, Bob Roberts and George Nogle. De Vinna picked up an Academy Award for Best Cinematography for his efforts at the 1929 ceremonies, the second year the cinematography award was given out. De Vinna had previously been to Tahiti with director Raoul Walsh when they made the 1923 island adventure Lost and Found on a South Sea Island for Goldwyn Pictures.

Frederick O'Brien had spent a year on Hiva Oa prior to the publication of his 1919 book, living amongst native Marquesan islanders. Robert Flaherty had lived with his wife and children in Samoa from April 1923 to December 1924 filming the feature documentary Moana released in January 1926 by Paramount Pictures.

Several years later MGM production head Irving Thalberg was in hospital recuperating and during his stay Thalberg read O'Brien's book. In 1927 Thalberg decided to film O'Brien's book. Flaherty, a friend of O'Brien's, was brought aboard as director while W. S. Van Dyke was added as support to Flaherty. The production would head to Papeete, Tahiti.

The new film would feature a supporting cast of almost all Tahitian islanders and/or actors with only the featured stars and a few heavies/villains coming from Hollywood. Flaherty, upon arriving in Tahiti, began shooting the film at a slow pace which was not practical for MGM.  After clashing with Van Dyke, Flaherty left the production, leaving Van Dyke as sole director for the film.  Van Dyke then finished the project on schedule.  However, Flaherty did shoot some scenes before departing the production, and some footage of his may be seen in the existing print, i.e. '...the lagoon in the jungle scene'.

A dispute over this film with Hunt Stromberg led David Selznick to quit Metro Goldwyn Mayer. "David thought it an idyllic story; Hunt said he wanted lots of tits."

This was the first time audiences heard the roar of Leo the Lion, over the MGM banner at the beginning of the film.

Recognition

Critical response
Mordaunt Hall felt the film was "average" and expressed disappointment at how the film was advertised as a "sound" film yet, the only sound (other than sound effects, whistling, cheering, crying etc.) was the yelling of the word "Hello" which itself had the volume of a whisper.

Awards and nominations
 1930, Won Academy Award for Best Cinematography for Clyde De Vinna

DVD release
On January 12, 2010, the film had its first home video release on DVD.

References
Notes

Bibliography
 Cinema Journal, Imagined Islands: White Shadows in the South Seas and Cultural Ambivalence, by Jeffrey Geiger c.2002

External links
 
 
 turnerclassicmovies "White Shadows in the South Seas" by Jeff Stafford
  White Shadows in the South Seas at SilentEra
 Artwork on cover of program to the film
Lobby card of White Shadows in the South Seas
White Shadows in the South Seas at Virtual History
 Woody directing Monte Blue in the vinage segment of the film, Clyde De Vinna at camera 
Surviving lantern slide

1928 films
Films directed by W. S. Van Dyke
1928 adventure films
American black-and-white films
American silent feature films
Films about race and ethnicity
Films shot in Tahiti
Films whose cinematographer won the Best Cinematography Academy Award
Films produced by Irving Thalberg
Metro-Goldwyn-Mayer films
Transitional sound films
Films set in Oceania
Films directed by Robert Flaherty
American adventure films
1920s romance films
Early sound films
American romance films
1920s American films
Silent adventure films